Talloires-Montmin is a commune in the Haute-Savoie department in the Auvergne-Rhône-Alpes region in Eastern France. In 2018, it had a population of 1,971. It was established on 1 January 2016 following the fusion of the former communes of Talloires and Montmin.

See also 
Communes of the Haute-Savoie department

References 

Communes of Haute-Savoie
Populated places established in 2016